Alma is an unincorporated community in the parish of Alma, Albert County, New Brunswick, Canada. It held village status prior to 2023. Alma is centered on the small delta of the Upper Salmon River and Cleveland Brook, where they empty into Salisbury Bay.

The headquarters of Fundy National Park is in Alma West, making tourism a major part of the local economy. Fishing, of lobster and scallops, is another primary economic activity.

History

The settlement, known as Salmon River Settlement, began in earnest as the lumbering trade took root with the exchange of land-grant title, and construction of a sawmill on the Upper Salmon River by its new owners. Prior to this, Loyalist John Coffin, who held the land grant, caused frustration for would-be settlers because of his absence.  Thus began the most vibrant period in the community's history.

The Parish of Alma was created surrounding the community in 1856, commemorating the then-recent Battle of Alma during the Crimean war. The Village municipality incorporated in 1966 following sweeping changes that disbanded county councils. 18 years earlier, the federal government had expropriated land in the village and parish west of the Upper Salmon River for the creation of Fundy National Park. Many homes were relocated east of the river as lumber barons gave way to the new land managers, the Parks Canada Agency. In addition to tourism related to the park, lobster and scallop fishing are an important industry based out of Alma's tidal harbour.

On 1 January 2023, Alma amalgamated with the villages of Hillsborough and Riverside-Albert and parts of five local service districts to form the new village of Fundy Albert. The community's name remains in official use.

Demographics 
Revised census figures based on the 2023 local governance reforms have not been released.

Notable people

Alma was the birthplace of Molly Kool, who in 1939 became Master Mariner for offshore sailing, a captain, a first in the Western World, sailing a commercial Bay of Fundy scow sloop between ports. A monument on the Alma waterfront marks her accomplishment.

Images

Climate 
Alma has a relatively cool, wet and snowy humid continental climate with significant seasonal differences in spite of its near-ocean location. Summers are warm but relatively short, whereas winters are relatively cold but milder than inland areas.

References

External links

Village of Alma

Communities in Albert County, New Brunswick
Former villages in New Brunswick